Lake of the Rivers is a salt lake in the Canadian province of Saskatchewan. It is in the Prairie Pothole Region of North America, which extends throughout three Canadian provinces and five U.S. states, and within Palliser's Triangle and the Great Plains ecoregion of Canada. The lake is long, narrow, shallow, and located in a valley that was formed by glacial meltwaters at the end of the ice age. The north end of the valley opens up to Old Wives Lake and south-east along the valley is Willow Bunch Lake. Beyond Willow Bunch Lake, the valley opens up into the Big Muddy Badlands.

The lake spans two rural municipalities, Lake of the Rivers No. 72 and Lake Johnston No. 102, and sits at the northern slope of the Missouri Coteau. The hamlet of Ardill and Highways 715 and 2 are at the northern end of the lake while Highway 717 is at the southern end. A section of Assiniboia Regional Park is at the reservoir and the river leaving the reservoir is a tributary of Lake of the Rivers.

See also 
List of lakes of Saskatchewan

References 

Lakes of Saskatchewan
Lake of the Rivers No. 72, Saskatchewan
Lake Johnston No. 102, Saskatchewan
Saline lakes of Canada